Heinrich Pesch, S.J. (17 September 1854 – 1 April 1926) was a German Roman Catholic ethicist and economist of the Solidarist school. His major work, Lehrbuch der Nationalökonomie, is generally regarded as a source for Pope Pius XI's social encyclical Quadragesimo anno.

Biography
After studying law at Bonn, Pesch entered the Society of Jesus in 1876. He made his novitiate with exiled German Jesuits in the Netherlands. For his studies of philosophy (1878-1881) Pesch was sent to Bleijenbeek, also in the Netherlands. He completed his theological studies at Ditton Hall (1884-1888). While in England, Pesch lectured for a few years at the Stella Matutina school. He was ordained priest in 1888.

From 1892 until 1900 Pesch was spiritual director at the Mainz seminary, where he wrote his first book Liberalism, Socialism and Christian Order. Through lectures of the publicist Rudolf Meyer Pesch became acquainted with the teachings of Marx and Rodbertus. After a renewed study of economics with Schmoller and Wagner in Berlin (1900-1902), Pesch moved to Luxembourg and worked on his major opus Lehrbuch der Nationalökonomie. He died in 1926.

Works
 Liberalismus, Socialismus und Christliche Gesellschaftsordnung, Vol. 2, Herder, 1900.
 Lehrbuch der Nationalökonomie, Freiburg im Breisgau, Herder, 1905-23 (5 Vol.)
 Die Soziale Befähigung der Kirche, Verlag der Germania, 1911.
 Ethik und Volkswirtschaft, Herdersche Verlagshandlung, 1918.

Works in English translation
 "Christian Solidarism." In: Joseph N. Moody (Ed.), Church and Society. New York: Arts, Inc., 1953.
 Heinrich Pesch on Solidarist Economics: Excerpts from the Lehrbuch Der Nationalökonomie. Translated by Rupert J. Ederer. University Press of America, 1998.
 Liberalism, Socialism and Christian Social Order, Translated by Rupert J. Ederer. Edwin Mellen Press, 2000 (5 vol.)
 Book 1: The Philosophical Roots Of Economic Liberalism
 Book 2: The Free Market Economy Or Economic Order?
 Book 3: Private Property As A Social Institution
 Book 4: The Christian Concept Of The State
 Book 5: Modern Socialism
 Teaching Guide to Economics, Translated and Edited by Rupert J. Ederer. Edwin Mellen Press, 2002 - 2003 (10 Vol.) 
 Book One: Foundations for Economic Life (2 vols.)
 Book Two: Economic Systems and the Nature and Dispositional Causes of the Wealth of a Nation (2 vols.)
 Book Three: The Active Causes in the Ongoing Economic Process (2 vols.)
 Book Four: The Satisfaction of a Nation’s Wants as the Purpose of the National Economy and Production (2 vols.)
 Book Five: General Economics (2 vols.)
 Ethics and the National Economy, Translated with an introduction by Rupert Ederer, IHS Press, 2003.

See also
 Social Justice
 Heinrich Pesch House

References

Further reading

 O'Boyle, Edward J. "Contributions of German and American Jesuits to Economics: The Last 100 Years," Forum for Social Economics 31 (2), Spring 2002.
 Briefs, Goetz. "Economics of Heinrich Pesch," Social Order 3, December 1953.
 Briefs, Goetz. "Pesch and his Contemporaries," Review of Social Economy 41 (3), 1983.
 Ederer, Rupert J. "Juan Donoso Cortes, Heinrich Pesch and Solidarism: An Ethical Economic System," Social Justice Review 72, July 1981.
 Ederer, Rupert J. "Solidarity, From Dogma to Economic System: Juan Donoso Cortes and Heinrich Pesch, S. J." International Journal of Social Economics 8 (5), 1981.
 Ederer, Rupert J. "Heinrich Pesch's Solidarism and Boris Ischboldin's Scientific Reformism," International Journal of Social Economics 8 (7), 1981.
 Harris, Abram L. "The Scholastic Revival: The Economics of Heinrich Pesch," Journal of Political Economy 54 (1), Feb., 1946.
 Nell-Breuning, Oswald Von. "Peschian Interest Theory," Social Order 1, April 1951.
 Messner, Johannes. "Fifty Years After the Death of Heinrich Pesch," Review of Social Economy 34 (2), October, 1976.
 Montes, Guillermo. "The Scope of Economics and Related Questions: The Peschian View," Catholic Social Science Review 2, 1997.
 Mulcahy, Richard E. "The Welfare Economics of Heinrich Pesch," The Quarterly Journal of Economics 63 (3), Aug., 1949.
 Mulcahy, Richard E. "Economic Freedom in Pesch," Social Order 1, April 1951.
 Mulcahy, Richard E. The Economics of Heinrich Pesch. New York: Henry Holt & Co., 1952.
 Müller, Franz H. Heinrich Pesch and his Theory of Christian Solidarism, The College of St. Thomas, 1941.
 Müller, Franz H. "The Principle of Solidarity in the Teachings of Father Henry Pesch, S. J.," Review of Social Economy 4 (1), 1946.
 Müller, Franz H. "Rejecting Right and Left: Heinrich Pesch and Solidarism," Thought 26, December 1951.
 Müller, Franz H. "Heinrich Pesch, SJ, 1854–1926: Social Economist in a Cassock", International Journal of Social Economics 11, 1984.
 Schuyler, J. B. "Pesch and Christian Solidarism," Catholic Mind 42, June 1944.
 Yenni, J. "Pesch's Goal of the Economy," Social Order 1, April 1951.

External links
 Author page at Edwin Mellen Press
 The Longest Economics Textbook
 Rediscovering Heinrich Pesch and Solidarism
 The Legacy of Solidarist Economics in the United States

1854 births
1926 deaths
Catholic social teaching
19th-century German Jesuits
20th-century German Jesuits
German economists